NA-92 Bhakkar-II is a constituency for the National Assembly of Pakistan.

Members of Parliament

2018-2022: NA-98 Bhakkar-II

Election 2002 

General elections were held on 10 Oct 2002. Chaudhry Shujat Hussain of PML-Q won by 103,508 votes.

Election 2008 

The result of general election 2008 in this constituency is given below.

Result 
Rashid Akbar Khan succeeded in the election 2008 and became the member of National Assembly.

Election 2013 

General elections were held on 11 May 2013. Afzal Khan Dhandla of PML-N won by 118,196 votes and became the  member of National Assembly.

Election 2018 

General elections were held on 25 July 2018.

See also
NA-91 Bhakkar-I
NA-93 Chiniot-I

References

External links 
Election result's official website

NA-074